Events from the year 1946 in Denmark.

Incumbents
 Monarch – Christian X
 Prime minister – Knud Kristensen

Events
 30 August – Princess Anne-Marie, future Queen of Greece, is born to Crown Prince Frederick and Crown Princess Ingrid of Sweden.

Sports

Football
 B03 wins the 1945–46 Danish 1st Division. It is their ninth Danish football championship.

Births
 9 January – Mogens Lykketoft, politician
 15 March – Krass Clement, photographer
 19 March – Dan Turèll, writer (died 1993)
 27 May – Niels-Henning Ørsted Pedersen, jazz bassist (died 2005)
 2 June – Inga Nielsen, opera singer (died 2008)
 30 August – Princess Anne-Marie, future Queen of Greece
 27 October – Peter Martins, ballet dancer, choreographer

Deaths
 3 February – Carl Theodor Zahle, politician, Council President of Denmark (born 1866)
 9 March – William Wain Prior, major-general, commander-in-chief of the Royal Danish Army 1939–41 (born 1876)
 26 March – Gerhard Heilmann, paleontologist, scientific illustrator (born 1859)
 26 April – Oluf Ring, composer (born 1886)
 20 May – Jacob Ellehammer, inventor (born 1871)
 26 May – Petrine Sonne, stage and film actress (born 1870)
 13 July – Valdemar Rørdam, national conservative poet, author of "Denmark in a Thousand Years" (born 1872)
 31 August – Paul von Klenau, composer and conductor (born 1883)
 10 October – Eyvind Johan-Svendsen, stage and film actor (born 1896)
 15 December – Johannes Friis-Skotte, politician, Minister of Public Works (Transport) 1924–1926 and 1929–1935 (born 1874)

Date unknown
 Johanne Agerskov, intermediary (born 1873)

References

 
Denmark
Years of the 20th century in Denmark
1940s in Denmark
1940 in Europe